Rosalyn Fairbank and Barbara Potter were the defending champions but did not compete that year.

Gigi Fernández and Lori McNeil won in the final 6–3, 6–7, 7–5 against Elizabeth Smylie and Wendy Turnbull.

Seeds
Champion seeds are indicated in bold text while text in italics indicates the round in which those seeds were eliminated.

 Patty Fendick /  Jill Hetherington (quarterfinals)
 Katrina Adams /  Zina Garrison (semifinals)
 Gigi Fernández /  Lori McNeil (champions)
 Elizabeth Smylie /  Wendy Turnbull (final)

Draw

External links
 1989 Virginia Slims of Newport Doubles Draw

Virginia Slims of Newport
1989 WTA Tour
1989 Hall of Fame Tennis Championships